Olivia McLoughlin (born 15 October 2004) is an English footballer who plays as a midfielder or defender for Aston Villa of the FA WSL.

Club career

Aston Villa 
After starting her career with Birmingham City, where she was named 2019–20 under-16 players' player of the year. 

McLoughlin moved to city rivals Aston Villa in the summer of 2020. On 12 January 2021, it was announced that Olivia McLoughlin had been promoted to the first team from the academy. She made her senior debut on 17 January as 65th-minute substitute, replacing Asmita Ale in a 7–0 loss to Manchester City in the FA WSL.

On 17 October 2022, two days after her 18th birthday, McLoughlin signed her first fully professional contract with Aston Villa.

International career 
McLoughlin has featured for the Under-15 and Under-16 England squads. On 20 October 2021, McLoughlin made her debut for the England U19s, in a 1–0 away victory over Republic of Ireland in a 2022 UEFA Women's Under-19 Championship qualification match. 

On 5 October 2022, McLoughlin scored her first youth international goal, in a 5–0 victory over Slovenia.

Career statistics

Club 
As of match played 1 October 2022.

References 

2004 births
Living people
English women's footballers
Aston Villa W.F.C. players
Women's Super League players
Women's association footballers not categorized by position
England women's youth international footballers